Baidiyam  is a village and rural commune in Mauritania.

Communes of Mauritania